The Farmacovigilancia Española, Datos de Reacciones Adversas (FEDRA), also known as the Spanish Pharmacovigilance Datatabase or Spanish Pharmacovigilance System, is a pharmacovigilance database in Spain which was developed in 1982.

See also
 Pharmacovigilance
 FDA Adverse Event Reporting System (FAERS)

References

External links
 https://www.notificaram.es/

Pharmacovigilance databases